The 1999 Parramatta Eels season was the 53rd in the club's history. Coached by Brian Smith and captained by Jarrod McCracken and Nathan Cayless, they competed in the National Rugby League's 1999 Telstra Premiership.

Summary
Parramatta continued their success and consistency into the second year of the new National Rugby League, finishing two points behind Minor Premiers Cronulla. Parramatta kicked off their finals series with a comfortable 30–16 win against Newcastle at Parramatta Stadium. 

However Parramatta could not back up that performance against Melbourne, after having a week off. Similar to the 1998 preliminary final loss to Canterbury, Parramatta lead the match 16-0 early before going into the half-time break winning 16-6. In the second half, Parramatta had chances to book their place in the grand final which included Jason Smith knocking the ball on with two players unmarked on his left hand side. This followed on from the first half where Dennis Moran knocked the ball on over the line where he was unmarked. In the end it was Melbourne who would comeback to win 18-16 at the Sydney Football Stadium in an upset victory.

Standings

Awards
Michael Cronin clubman of the year award: David Penna
Ken Thornett Medal (Players' player): Michael Vella
Jack Gibson Award (Coach's award): David Kidwell
Eric Grothe Rookie of the Year Award: Luke Burt

References

Parramatta Eels seasons
Parramatta Eels season